National Forest may refer to:
 National forest or state forest, a forest administered or protected by a sovereign state
 National forest (Brazil)
 National forest (France)
 National forest (United States)
 State Forests (Poland)
 The National Forest (England)

See also 
 List of types of formally designated forests
 List of Brazilian National Forests
 List of U.S. National Forests